Deube is a river of Thuringia, Germany. It joins the Ilm near Stadtilm.

See also
List of rivers of Thuringia

Rivers of Thuringia
Rivers of Germany